Walter Alfred Rosam (25 October 1883, in Hamburg – 14 August 1916, in Ukraine) was a German Post-Impressionist painter of Jewish ancestry; known for still-lifes and landscapes.

Biography 
He was married in 1905 and had a daughter in 1906.

With Franz Nölken and Friedrich Ahlers-Hestermann, fellow members of the Künstlerklub, he went to Paris in 1907 and became part of the artistic circle that met at Le Dôme Café. Two years later, he took another trip to Paris with his friends and enrolled for advanced studies with Henri Matisse at his short-lived Académie.

However, one of the main supporters of Siebelist and his students, Alfred Lichtwark, rejected their work because he "could not make friends with the teachings of Matisse".

In 1910 and 1911, he took extended study trips to Southern France and Italy. After the outbreak of World War I, he joined the Army in Königsberg. He died in a Russian military hospital near Kovel, on the southern flank of the Eastern Front in 1916.

References

Further reading 
 Carsten Meyer-Tönnesmann: Der Hamburgische Künstlerclub von 1897. Verlag Atelier im Bauernhaus, Fischerhude 1997,

External links 

ArtNet: More works by Rosam

1883 births
1916 deaths
20th-century German painters
20th-century German male artists
German male painters
German landscape painters
German still life painters
Artists from Hamburg
Jewish painters
German military personnel killed in World War I
German Jewish military personnel of World War I